Shivashankar is a 1990 Indian Kannada-language film, directed by H. R. Bhargava and produced by Bhargava and Rajaram. The film stars Vishnuvardhan, Shobhana, Ramesh Bhat and Mukhyamantri Chandru. The film has musical score by Rajan–Nagendra. The core story line of the movie is inspired by the 1985 Hong Kong film Heart of Dragon, starring Jackie Chan, which was also later on used in the 1992 Hindi movie Jaan Se Pyaara - which followed the plot of the original but adapted the template of this movie by having the lead in dual roles of brothers.

Cast

Vishnuvardhan as Shivu and Shankar (Dual Roles)
Shobhana as Girija
Ramesh Bhat
Mukhyamantri Chandru as Advocate
Sudheer
Doddanna as Yogi
Sihikahi Chandru
Master Manjunath as Manjunath
Master Ravindra
Master Vinod Kumar
Master Anand
Master Madan

Soundtrack
The music was composed by Rajan–Nagendra.

References

External links
 
 

1990 films
1990s Kannada-language films
Films scored by Rajan–Nagendra
Films directed by H. R. Bhargava